Amblyglyphidodon curacao; also known as the staghorn damselfish , the clouded damselfish or the bare-snouted sergeant major; is a species of marine fish in the family Pomacentridae, the damselfishes and the clownfishes. It's widespread throughout the tropical waters of the western Pacific Ocean. This species is a small sized fish that can reach a maximum size of 11 cm length.

References

External links
 

curacao
Fish described in 1787